The Pawnee Chief is an American helicopter that was designed and produced by Pawnee Aviation of Longmont, Colorado and later McCook, Nebraska. It was first flown in December 2005. Now out of production, when it was available the aircraft was supplied as a kit for amateur construction.

Design and development
The Chief was designed to comply with the US Experimental - Amateur-built aircraft rules. It features a single main rotor, a two-bladed tail rotor, two or three-seats-in side-by-side configuration in an enclosed cockpit with a windshield and skid-type landing gear. The aircraft fuselage is made from welded 4130 steel tubing with a composite cockpit fairing. Its  diameter two-bladed rotor is made from carbon-fiber-reinforced polymer.

The Chief was the subject of a protracted development time line. The company explained the long development, "we were determined not to put a product on the market before its time. We have seen other kits sold that did not complete their development and testing.  Their customers paid for completion of the development and in reality did much of their testing.. By delaying our availability project until it was truly completed, we will avoid placing unnecessary a lot of "Airworthiness Directives" and flight restrictions on our aircraft."

In December 2005 first kit delivery was forecast for as early as January 2006, with a production rate of eight to ten per month and a first-year production of 50 to 60 kits expected for 2006. In 2005 when the aircraft first flew the company reported having "700 interested customers". The manufacturer estimated the construction time from the supplied kit as 150–200 hours.

The company seems to have gone out of business in late 2008.

Operational history
By April 2015 two examples were registered in the United States with the Federal Aviation Administration, although both registrations had expired. A total of three Chiefs had been registered at one time.

On 28 September 2006 a Chief crashed while hovering, with minor injuries to the pilot and passenger. The National Transportation Safety Board report stated, "The amateur built helicopter impacted the ground during a test flight following the failure of a welded joint at a cyclic control cable bracket resulting in a loss of control authority. A post impact fire ensued, destroying the helicopter. The pilot reported he was in a low hover when the tail came up and the helicopter tilted. One of the skids subsequently caught the ground causing the helicopter to roll over. Examination of the helicopter revealed that a welded joint failed at a cyclic control cable bracket on the main rotor mast. Failure of the welded bracket caused the loss of input control authority from the cyclic control to the main rotor."

Specifications (Chief)

See also
List of rotorcraft

References

External links
Photo of a Pawnee Chief

Chief
2000s United States sport aircraft
2000s United States helicopters
Homebuilt aircraft
Single-engined piston helicopters
Aircraft first flown in 2005